The 2010 Pavel Roman Memorial was the 16th edition of an annual international ice dancing competition held in Olomouc, Czech Republic. The event was held on November 19–21, 2010 at the Zimní Stadion Olomouc. Ice dancers competed in the senior, junior, advanced novice, and basic novice levels.

Results

Senior

External links
 results

Pavel Roman Memorial, 2010
Pavel Roman Memorial